Rope-a-dope is a boxing strategy associated with Muhammad Ali.

"Rope-a-dope" may also refer to:

 Rope-A-Dope, a 1976 album by Lester Bowie
 Rope-a-Dope, a 1994 album by Antietam
 Ropeadope Records, an American record album